Irene Wang Yuen Yuen  (born March 27, 1986) is a Hong Kong model and actress. Wang was known for her roles in the films Flash Point and The Monkey King.

Early life 
Wang was born as Wang Yuen Yuen in Lima, Peru on 27 March 1986. Wang's mother is Jennifer Wang. Wang's father Daniel Wang ran a jewelry business there before moving to Canada. There her father was nicknamed as the King of Diamonds (鑽石大王) and Wang and her sister Cissy Wang were known as Diamond Ladies (鑽石名媛). 
Wang began her entertainment career at the age of 12.

Education 
Wang studied Business Administration at McMaster University in Ontario and graduated from the Shanghai Theatre Academy to become an actress.

Career 
Like her elder sister Cissy, her main work is as a model.
In 2002, Wang began her television acting career in Wind and Cloud. In 2007, Wang debuted her film in Flash Point.

Personal life
In 2011, Wang first met Karson Choi, the son of the King of Toys Francis Choi, through the introduction by friends. In 2013, Wang married Karson Choi at Beas River Country Club in Hong Kong. Wang's wedding wardrobe was designed by Cecilia Yau, a Hong Kong fashion designer.

Wang has one daughter Celine (born in 2014), and twin sons, Christian and Kameron (born in 2016).

Filmography

Films

Television dramas

References

External links
 
 
 
 Irene Wong at hkmdb.com
 Irene Wang at hkcinemagic.com

1986 births
Living people
20th-century Hong Kong actresses
21st-century Hong Kong actresses
Hong Kong female models
Hong Kong film actresses
McMaster University alumni
Shanghai Theatre Academy alumni